The following is a list of all team-to-team transactions that have occurred in the National Hockey League (NHL) during the 1956–57 NHL season. It lists which team each player has been traded to and for which player(s) or other consideration(s), if applicable.

Transactions 

Notes
 Montreal held the rights to recall the players.  MacPherson returned to Montreal after training camp on October 10, 1956.  Mosdell returned to Montreal on September 20, 1957.
 Montreal held the rights to recall the player.  Mazur returned to Montreal in November, 1956 (exact date unknown).
 Transaction completed in June, 1957 (exact date unknown).

References

Transactions
National Hockey League transactions